This is a list of lighthouses in the Cayman Islands.

Lighthouses

See also
 Lists of lighthouses and lightvessels

References

External links
 

Cayman Islands
Cayman Islands

Lighthouses